was a town located in Sakai District, Fukui Prefecture, Japan.

As of 2003, the town had an estimated population of 23,876 and a density of 977.32 persons per km2. The total area was 24.43 km2.

On March 20, 2006, Harue, along with the towns of Sakai (former), Maruoka and Mikuni (all from Sakai District), was merged to create the city of Sakai.

External links
 Sakai official website 

Dissolved municipalities of Fukui Prefecture
Sakai, Fukui